Robert Mitchell was a Scottish professional footballer who played in the Football League for Barnsley as an inside right.

References 

Scottish footballers
English Football League players
Brentford F.C. players
Association football inside forwards

1889 births
Year of death missing
Footballers from Paisley, Renfrewshire
Barnsley F.C. players
Cliftonville F.C. players
Lisburn Distillery F.C. players
NIFL Premiership players